Matějka (feminine Matějková) is a Czech surname.
Matejka (feminine Matejková) is a Slovak surname.

Notable people include:

 Adrian Matejka, American poet
 Alena Matejka, Czech sculptor
 Alice Matějková, Czech athlete
 František Xaver Matějka, Czech musician
 James J. Matejka Jr., American philatelist
 Jozef Ján Matejka, Slovak writer
 Ladislav Matějka, Czech linguist
 Ludmila Seefried-Matějková, Czech sculptor
 Lukáš Matejka, Slovak ice hockey player
 Lukáš Matějka, Czech footballer
 Mark Matejka, American rock guitarist
 Róbert Matejka, Slovak footballer
 Václav Matějka, Czech film director
 Zdeněk Matějka, Czech chemist

Czech-language surnames
Slovak-language surnames